Avraham Rafael Drori (born Abram Kozinski; 23 May 1919 – 20 August 1964) was an Israeli politician who served as a member of the Knesset for Herut between 1961 and 1964.

Biography
Born in Łódź in Poland, Drori was a member of the Betar youth movement. He made aliyah to Mandatory Palestine in 1935, and was a member of the Betar enlistment units in Samaria and the Galilee. He joined the Irgun, and was later co-opted into the IDF, from which he was demobilised with the rank of major.

He joined Herut, and later became its general secretary. He was on the party's list for the 1959 elections, but was not placed high enough on the list to win a seat. However, he entered the Knesset on 21 March 1961 as a replacement for the deceased Shimshon Unichman. He retained his seat in the November 1961 elections, but died in office in August 1964 at the age of 45. His seat was taken by Yosef Kremerman.

References

External links

1919 births
1964 deaths
Polish emigrants to Mandatory Palestine
Betar members
Irgun members
Israeli soldiers
Herut politicians
Members of the 4th Knesset (1959–1961)
Members of the 5th Knesset (1961–1965)
Burials at Kiryat Shaul Cemetery